Abimaela Palomo Tagasa (April 16, 1935 – March 24, 2018), better known as Mely Tagasa, was a Filipino actress, screenwriter and dubbing producer. She was widely known for playing Miss Tapia in the sitcoms Baltic & Co. (GMA) and Iskul Bukol (IBC).

Early life and career
Tagasa was raised in La Paz, Tarlac, and Nueva Ecija, Philippines. At age 9 her family moved to Manila following the end of World War II.

She was already enamored with radio. Once, she joined some friends and auditioned in a singing contest, which she won. At 17, Tagasa was playing roles on radio and set aside her college studies.

Personal life
Tagasa had three daughters and one son. Her eldest daughter Gina Marissa Tagasa is a writer for movies and television in the Philippines.

Filmography

Television

Film

Death
Under a month shy of her 83rd birthday, Tagasa died of stroke on 24 March 2018, aged 82, after being in a coma for two weeks.

References

External links

1935 births
2018 deaths
Actresses from Tarlac
Filipino screenwriters
Filipino television actresses